George Ubsdell (4 April 1845 — 15 October 1905) was an English first-class cricketer and umpire.

Ubsdell was born at Southampton in April 1845. A professional cricketer, Ubsdell made his debut in first-class cricket for Hampshire against Sussex at Southampton in 1864, which was Hampshire County Cricket Club's inaugural match in first-class cricket. He played first-class cricket for Hampshire until 1870, making fifteen appearances. Playing as a wicket-keeper in the Hampshire side, he took four catches and made thirteen stumpings, an unusual statistic for a wicket-keeper in that they normally end their career with more catches than stumpings. In a match against Surrey in 1865, he made five stumpings in Surrey's second innings. As a batsman, he scored 170 runs at an average of 6.80, with a highest score of 29. Besides playing county cricket, Ubsdell was engaged as a club cricketer at Hampton Wick (1867 and 1869), Gore Court (1868 and 1870–71), Liverpool (1872), and Childwall (1874–76). He was additionally engaged in a coaching capacity by Marlborough College and Exeter College, Oxford. He was further described as a player by Haygarth in Scores and Biographies as "an excellent hitter to all parts of the field, especially to the off, bowls round-armed, middle-paced, and is also a capital wicket-keeper". Following the end of his first-class career, he spent 12 years as a groundsman at Liverpool Cricket Club's Aigburth Ground. Ubsdell later stood as an umpire in a first-class match between Liverpool and District and the touring Australians in 1882. Ubsdell died at the Palatine Hotel in Garston, Liverpool in October 1905.

References

External links

1845 births
1905 deaths
Cricketers from Southampton
English cricketers
Hampshire cricketers
Groundskeepers
English cricket umpires